The battle of Jandiala took place in December 1764 between the Durranis and the Sikhs, during Ahmad Shah Abdali's seventh campaign into India. Ahmad Shah Abdali and his army marched towards Jandiala and as soon as they reached near the town, Sikhs opposed them and a battle took place where Afghans were defeated and the Afghan commander Rahim Khan Bakhshi was killed.

Background
Ahmad Shah Abdali marched his seventh campaign into India after hearing reports about the Sikh triumphs, with 18,000 Afghans and adding another 12,000 soldiers under the chief of Qalat, Nasir Khan Baluch. When the united army marched from Eminabad to Lahore,  the team of Durrani scouts were attacked near Lahore by the Sikhs, commanded by Charat Singh, and as Ahmad Shah Abdali was informed about the attack, he immediately had Nasir Khan march to assist the scout party. A long furious battle took place till nightfall where Nasir Khan's horse was shot down, causing panic among his soldiers, and Nur Muhammad barely making an escape. The battle ended with the retirement of both parties. Ahmad Shah Abdali then marched towards Amritsar and did not find any Sikh army except for 30 Sikh civilians in the Ramgarh fort, who came out of the fort and fearlessly attacked Durrani army, without any regard of the consequence, and willing to die for the cause of their religion. The thirty Sikhs engaged in a close fight without any weapons against the Durrani soldiers and laid down their lives in the Battle of Darbar Sahib (1764). Ahmad Shah Abdali returned back to Lahore and then marched towards Sirhind and decided to pass through Upper Bari and Jallandar Doab as this was the area where not only the Sikhs lived but was also richly fertile for the soldiers to feed themselves on the way. Along the way, the Afghans destroyed the home and crops of the Sikhs and as soon as they draw closer to town Jandiala, they were opposed by the Sikhs where a battle ensued. All this time, the Sikhs were lingering in a distance behind Afghans utilizing guerilla tactics.

Battle
As Abdali and his forces got nearer to the town of Jandiala, the Sikhs opposed them and a battle took place resulting in the defeat of Afghans. Afghan commander Rahim Khan Bakhshi was killed in the battle.

Aftermath
After defeat Ahmad Shah Durrani marched towards Batala, reaching the town in 15 days of his travel from Lahore.

References 

Battles involving the Durrani Empire
Battles involving the Sikhs